An election to Galway County Council took place on 23 May 2014 as part of that year's Irish local elections. 39 councillors were elected from five electoral divisions by PR-STV voting for a five-year term of office, an increase in 9 seats from 2009. In addition Ballinasloe Town Council, Loughrea Town Council and Tuam Town Council were all abolished.

Fine Gael remained the largest party in terms of votes while having the same seats as Fianna Fáil. Fine Gael lost 1 seat overall, in Loughrea, while Fianna Fáil made 5 gains; 1 each in Ballinasloe, Connemara, Athenry-Oranmore and 2 in Loughrea. Independents had another good election winning 4 additional seats while Sinn Féin made gains in Connemara and in Athenry-Oranmore. Republican Sinn Féin retained their solitary seat in Connemara.**

Results by party

Results by Electoral Area

Athenry-Oranmore

Ballinasloe

Connemara

Loughrea

Tuam

References

Changes Since 2014
† On 11 October 2014 Michael Fitzmaurice was elected to the Dáil in a by-election for the Roscommon–South Leitrim. In November 2014 Independent Des Joyce was co-opted to his seat.
†† On 21 May 2015 Athenry-Oranmore Independent Cllr James Charity joined the Renua party and ceased to be an Independent. He left the party on 30 July 2015.
†††Loughrea Fianna Fáil Councillor Anne Rabbitte was elected to the Dáil in the Irish general election 2016 for the Galway East constituency. Ivan Canning was co-opted to fill the vacancy on 16 March 2016.
††††Tuam Independent Councillor Seán Canney was elected to the Dáil in the Irish general election 2016 for the Galway East constituency. Billy Connelly was co-opted to fill the vacancy on 16 March 2016.
††††† Athenry-Oranmore Sinn Féin Councillor Gabriel Cronnelly resigned from the party and became an Independent citing ongoing unrest around the way the party dealt with unethical behaviour on 3 December 2017.
†††††† Loughrea Independent Councillor Michael (Stroke) Fahy joined Fianna Fáil on 16 December 2018. He died on 3 April 2019 following a short illness.

External links
 Official website

2014 Irish local elections
2014